Sfera Stin Kardia (Greek: Σφαίρα Στην Καρδιά; English: Bullet in the heart) is the fourth studio album of Greek artist, Mariada Pieridi. It was released on 5 December 2005 by Universal Music Greece and later received gold certification, selling 20,000 units in Greece.

Track listing

Singles
The following single was officially released to radio stations and made into music videos. The songs "Den Eimai Ego", "S' Eho Anagki" and "Sfera Stin Kardia", despite not having been released as singles, managed to gain radio airplay with the following single.

"Afti I Agapi"

"Afti I Agapi" was the first single from the album and released in November 2005 with music video, directed by Giorgos Gkavalos. The song is a laiko-pop uptembo track and had massive airplay.

Credits

Personnel 

 Vasilis Armenis – keyboards (tracks: 5)
 Giannis Bithikotsis – bouzouki (tracks: 2, 3, 4, 8, 9, 10, 11) / cura, baglama (tracks: 4, 8, 10, 11)
 Giorgos Chatzopoulos – guitars (tracks: 1, 2, 6, 7, 8, 11)
 Vasilis Diamantis – saxophone (tracks: 12)
 Akis Diximos – second vocal (tracks: 3)
 Stavros Douskas – guitars (tracks: 4)
 Telis Kafkas – bass (tracks: 3, 4, 9, 10)
 Giorgos Kaloudis – guitars (tracks: 12)
 Giannis Kifonidis – orchestration (tracks: 4, 12)
 Katerina Kiriakou – backing vocals (tracks: 1, 2, 6, 7, 8, 9, 11)
 Kostas Miliotakis – orchestration, programming, keyboards, bass (tracks: 3, 9, 10)
 Alkis Misirlis – drums (tracks: 2, 8, 11)
 Andreas Mouzakis – drums (tracks: 3, 4, 5, 7, 9, 10)
 Arsenis Nasis – percussion (tracks: 9)
 Alex Panagi – backing vocals (tracks: 1, 2, 6, 7, 8, 9, 11)
 Christos Pertsinidis – guitars (tracks: 3, 9, 10)
 Kostas Platakis – orchestration, programming, bouzouki (tracks: 5)
 Manolis Platakis – guitars (tracks: 5)
 Evita Sereti – backing vocals (tracks: 5)
 Nikos Vardis – bass (tracks: 5)
 Panagiotis Vasiliou – percussion (tracks: 4)
 Vaggelis Vasiliou – orchestration, programming, keyboards (tracks: 4, 12)
 Alexandros Vourazelis – orchestration, programming, keyboards (tracks: 1, 2, 6, 7, 8, 11)
 Giannis Zoumis – keyboards (tracks: 5)

Production 

 Takis Argiriou – sound engineer, mix engineer (tracks: 3, 9, 10)
 Aris Binis – sound engineer, mix engineer (tracks: 1, 2, 6, 7, 8, 11)
 Thodoris Chrisanthopoulos – mastering
 Vaso Georgiadi – hair styling, make up
 Giorgos Kalfamanolis – photographer
 Giannis Kifonidis – production manager, sound engineer, mix engineer (tracks: 4, 12)
 Kostas Miliotakis – production manager (tracks: 3, 9, 10)
 Dimitris Mitsianis – artwork
 Lefteris Neromiliotis – sound engineer, mix engineer (tracks: 5)
 Kostas Platakis – production manager (tracks: 5)
 Alexandros Vourazelis – production manager (tracks: 1, 2, 6, 7, 8, 11)

Charts 
Sfera Stin Kardia made its debut at number 15 on the 'Top 50 Greek Albums' charts by IFPI.

After months, it was certified gold according to sales.

References

2005 albums
Greek-language albums
Mariada Pieridi albums
Universal Music Greece albums